John Keddie Dewar (14 December 1923 – 19 October 2011) was a Scottish footballer who played as a left winger. Dewar began his footballing career shortly after the Second World War with Heart of Midlothian, scoring three goals in as many appearances before moving to Dundee United in 1947. After four years at Tannadice, Dewar moved to Forfar Athletic, where he failed to make an appearance. Dewar left part-time professional football in 1952 to take up a full-time career as a mining surveyor and planner with the National Coal Board.

External links
 

1923 births
Scottish footballers
Scottish Football League players
Heart of Midlothian F.C. players
Dundee United F.C. players
Forfar Athletic F.C. players
People from Buckhaven
2011 deaths
Footballers from Fife
Association football midfielders